Lesbian, gay, bisexual, transgender (LGBT) organizations may refer to LGBT rights organizations or to groups formed for other purposes:
LGBT rights organization
List of LGBT-related organizations
List of LGBT rights organizations, organizations whose primary mission is campaigning for LGBT rights

See also
PFLAG (disambiguation)